Minhaz Merchant is an editor, author and publisher. He founded the pioneering media firm Sterling Newspapers Pvt. Ltd. which was later acquired by the Indian Express Group.

Career
Minhaz through his media startups, has founded and launched 10 specialised magazines – Gentleman, GFQ, TV and Video World, Technocrat, Business Computer, Mega City, Business Barons, Banking & Finance, élan and Innovate. He has written seven books and is the biographer of former Prime Minister Rajiv Gandhi, the late industrialist Aditya Birla  and the chairman of Larsen & Toubro, A.M. Naik.

Minhaz has appeared on numerous television news programmes on India Today TV, TimesNow and NDTV. His YouTube channel features a regular current affairs show Head-On with Minhaz Merchant.

Apart from being a media entrepreneur, Minhaz is a widely published newspaper columnist and television commentator. He is the author of The New Clash of Civilizations: How the Contest Between America, China, India and Islam will Shape Our Century.

Education
Minhaz Merchant studied in Cathedral and John Connon School, Mumbai, West Buckland School, Devon, England, and St. Xaviers College, Bombay University. He holds an honours degree in physics and mathematics and is the recipient of the Lady Jeejeebhoy scholarship for physics.

Personal
Minhaz was born in Bhavnagar, Gujarat, to a prominent industrialist Muslim family. His father, D.M. Merchant, was one of India’s first business graduates from the University of California, Berkeley, in 1950. Minhaz is married to the artist Kahini Merchant and has two children Suhail and Tehzeeb.

References

Indian male journalists
20th-century Indian biographers
Living people
Indian magazine editors
20th-century Indian male writers
Year of birth missing (living people)
Male biographers